Mohamed Leftah (1946 – 20 July 2008) was a Moroccan novelist and literary critic who wrote in French. He wrote ten novels and worked for Matin du Sahara and Temps du Maroc.

Biography 
Leftah was born in 1946 in Settat, Morocco. He studied in Casablanca, then he entered a school of Public works engineers works, in Paris. He returned to Morocco, he became a computer scientist then a literary journalist at Le Matin du Sahara and Temps du Maroc. In 1990, he returned to France and began his novel writing career. In 1992, after the publication of Demoiselles de Numidie by Éditions de l'Aube. Salim Jay introduced him to Editions de La Différence. The publishing company published Au bonheur des limbes, Ambre ou les métamorphoses de l'amour, L'Enfant de marbre, Une fleur dans la nuit suivi de Sous le soleil et le clair de lune and Un martyr de notre temps. In 2000, he moved from Morocco to Cairo, Egypt.

Death
He died at Sunday July 20 2008 in Cairo at the age of 62.

References

External links
Biography in La Difference  (retrieved on March 3, 2009)
Obituary in Livres Hebdo  (retrieved on March 3, 2009)

Moroccan literary critics
Moroccan novelists
Moroccan male writers
Male novelists
Moroccan writers in French
1946 births
2008 deaths
People from Settat
Moroccan emigrants to Egypt
20th-century novelists
20th-century male writers
20th-century Moroccan writers
21st-century Moroccan writers